Ciego is a Spanish word meaning "blind". It may refer to:

Places
Ciego de Ávila, a Cuban city, seat of the homonym province
Ciego de Ávila Province, a Cuban province
Arriete-Ciego Montero, a Cuban village in Cienfuegos Province

Other
Ciego Montero, a Cuban brand of bottled water